The cardinal virtues are four virtues of mind and character in both classical philosophy and Christian theology. They are prudence, justice, fortitude, and temperance. They form a virtue theory of ethics. The term cardinal comes from the Latin  (hinge); virtues are so called because they are regarded as the basic virtues required for a virtuous life. 

These principles derive initially from Plato in Republic Book IV, 426–435.  Aristotle expounded them systematically in the Nicomachean Ethics.  They were also recognized by the Stoics and Cicero expanded on them. In the Christian tradition, they are also listed in the Apocrypha in Wisdom of Solomon 8:7 and 4 Maccabees 1:18-19, and Ambrose, Augustine of Hippo, and Thomas Aquinas adapted them while expanding on the theological virtues.

Four cardinal virtues 
 Prudence (also Wisdom, Sophia), the ability to discern the appropriate course of action to be taken in a given situation at the appropriate time, with consideration of potential consequences.
 Justice: also considered as fairness; the Greek word also having the meaning righteousness
 Fortitude: also termed courage: forbearance, strength, endurance, and the ability to confront fear, uncertainty, and intimidation
 Temperance: also known as restraint, the practice of self-control, abstention, discretion, and moderation tempering the appetition. Plato considered , which may also be translated as sound-mindedness, to be the most important virtue.

Antiquity 
The four cardinal virtues appeared as a group (sometimes included in larger lists) long before they were later given this title.

Hellenistic philosophy 
Plato identified the four cardinal virtues with the classes of the city described in The Republic, and with the faculties of man. Plato narrates a discussion of the character of a good city where the following is agreed upon.

Temperance was common to all classes, but primarily associated with the producing classes, the farmers and craftsmen, and with the animal appetites, to whom no special virtue was assigned. Fortitude was assigned to the warrior class and to the spirited element in man. Prudence was assigned to the rulers and to reason. Justice stands outside the class system and divisions of man, and rules the proper relationship among the three of them.

Plato sometimes lists holiness amongst the cardinal virtues. He especially associates holiness with justice, but leaves their precise relationship unexplained.

In Aristotle's Rhetoric, we read:

They are expounded fully in the Nicomachean Ethics III.6 — V.2 

Philo of Alexandria, a Hellenistic Jewish philosopher, also recognized the four cardinal virtues as prudence, temperance, courage, and justice. In his writings, he states:  

These virtues, according to Philo, serve as guiding principles for a virtuous and fulfilling life.

Roman philosophy 
The Roman philosopher and statesman Cicero (106–43 BC), like Plato, limits the list to four virtues:

Cicero discusses these further in De Officiis (I, V and following).

The Roman Emperor Marcus Aurelius discusses these in Book V:12 of Meditations and views them as the "goods" that a person should identify in one's own mind, as opposed to "wealth or things which conduce to luxury or prestige".

Suggestions of the Stoic virtues can be found in fragments in the Diogenes Laertius and Stobaeus.

In the Platonist view the four cardinal virtues are described in "Definitions". Wisdom (phronesis) may translated as; it may be the ability to enhance the actual happiness of the individual or whole of society; differentiating between what is good and bad; the knowledge about how to obtain happiness; the disposition by which we may be able to judge and know what would be “appropriate action” under different circumstances, this requires knowledge of good, bad and indifferent things in life; the opposite is folly, the vice.

Justice (dikaiosunê) may be said to mean; the unanimity of the soul with the entirety of itself, and the good discipline in each of the components of our soul and thus being able to live that way with each other or concerning each other person; the ability of the state to appropriately distribute things according to how much that person deserves (such as merit); to not be particularly difficult towards others and thus to appear to other's universally to be just; the state of being a law-abiding citizen or civilian; social equality; laws that can be appropriately justified, the state where acts in obedience to those laws.

Moderation or temperance (sôphrosunê) means the following; the ability to restrict the experience of desire and pleasure sense experience that normally occurs with that which normal for that person, nothing which the soul does not already experience; harmony and good discipline where when applied to the overall pleasure or pain so that we experience normal pleasures and pains; to have agreement or parsimony with the soul so as it becomes the ruler and to being ruled; normal personal independence; good discipline when required in the soul; rational agreement within the soul about what should be admirable and what should be deemed contemptible; where a person is more cautious about what he or she chooses, because its a question of choosing something between the extremes in the polarity.

Courage (andreia) can be translated as; where you can overcome fear in your soul when action is required; military confidence; having knowledge and understanding of the relevant facts in warfare; the preservation of fearless beliefs in regards to the terrors or experiences so that we do not shrink away from our role in warfare; self-restraint in the soul about so that what is fearful or terrible no longer stymie's; being bold enough to have obedience to wisdom; being so fearless as to be undaunted when faced with death; the condition of standing on firm guard to maintain good judgment in difficult or dangerous situations; force which can counterbalance what is hostile or violent; the force of courage to stay committed to desirable virtues when the situations to test them arise; the ability to have a calm soul when faced with frightening or encouraging discussion and events, the ability to not be discouraged; the state of things or ourselves when the law is appreciated rather than diminished in importance for our day to day lives.

In the Bible 
The cardinal virtues are listed in the deuterocanonical book Wisdom of Solomon, which in 8:7 reads:

They are also found in other non-canonical scriptures like 4 Maccabees 1:18–19, which relates:

In the New Testament 

Wisdom, usually Sophia, rather than prudence, is discussed extensively in all parts of the New Testament. It is a major topic of 1 Corinthians 2, where the author discusses how divine teaching and power are greater than worldly wisdom.

Justice is taught extensively in the gospels, where most translators give it as "righteousness".

Plato's word for Fortitude is not present in the New Testament, but the virtues of steadfastness and patient endurance are highly praised.

Temperance, usually translated "sobriety," is present in the New Testament, along with self-control.

In Christian tradition 

Catholic moral theology drew from both the Wisdom of Solomon and the Fourth Book of Maccabees in developing its thought on the virtues. Ambrose used the expression "cardinal virtues":

Augustine of Hippo, discussing the morals of the church, described them:

In relation to the theological virtues 
The "cardinal" virtues are not the same as the three theological virtues: Faith, Hope, and Charity (Love), named in 1 Corinthians 13.

Because of this reference, a group of seven attributes is sometimes listed by adding the four cardinal virtues (prudence, temperance, fortitude, justice) and three theological virtues (faith, hope, charity).
Together, they compose what is known as the seven virtues. While the first four date back to Greek philosophers and were applicable to all people seeking to live moral lives, the theological virtues appear to be specific to Christians as written by Paul in the New Testament.

Efforts to relate the cardinal and theological virtues differ. Augustine sees faith as coming under justice. Beginning with a wry comment about the moral mischief of pagan deities, he writes:

Dante Alighieri also attempts to relate the cardinal and theological virtues in his Divine Comedy, most notably in the complex allegorical scheme drawn in Purgatorio XXIX to XXXI. Depicting a procession in the Garden of Eden (which the author situates at the top of the mountain of purgatory), Dante describes a chariot drawn by a gryphon and accompanied by a vast number of figures, among which stand three women on the right side dressed in red, green and white, and four women on the left, all dressed in red. The chariot is generally understood to represent the holy church, with the women on left and right representing the theological and cardinal virtues respectively. The exact meaning of the allegorical women's role, behaviour, interrelation and color-coding remains a matter of literary interpretation.

In relation to the seven deadly sins 
In the High Middle Ages, some authors opposed the seven virtues (cardinal plus theological) to the seven deadly sins. However, “treatises exclusively concentrating on both septenaries are actually quite rare.” and “examples of late medieval catalogues of virtues and vices which extend or upset the double heptad can be easily multiplied.” And there are problems with this parallelism:

Contemporary thought 
Jesuit scholars Daniel J. Harrington and James F. Keenan, in their Paul and Virtue Ethics (2010), argue for seven "new virtues" to replace the classical cardinal virtues in complementing the three theological virtues, mirroring the seven earlier proposed in Bernard Lonergan's Method in Theology (1972): "be humble, be hospitable, be merciful, be faithful, reconcile, be vigilant, and be reliable".

Allegory 

The Cardinal Virtues are often depicted as female allegorical figures and were a popular subject for funerary sculpture. The attributes and names of these figures may vary according to local tradition.

In many churches and artwork the Cardinal Virtues are depicted with symbolic items:

 Justice
 – sword, balance and scales, a crown

 Temperance
 – wheel, bridle and reins, vegetables and fish, cup, water and wine in two jugs

 Fortitude
 – armor, club, with a lion, palm, tower, a yoke, a broken column

 Prudence
 – book, scroll, mirror, (occasionally) an attacking serpent

Notable depictions include sculptures on the tomb of Francis II, Duke of Brittany and the tomb of John Hotham. They were also depicted in the garden at Edzell Castle.

See also
 Cardinal and Theological Virtues (Raphael)
 Civic virtue
 Seven deadly sins
 Seven virtues
 Theological virtues

Notes

References

Sources

External links 

 
 
 

Christian ethics
Virtue
Platonism
Christian terminology